XHVUN-FM is a radio station on 104.3 FM in Nava, Coahuila. It is owned by Grupo Martínez and known as La Consentida with a grupera format.

History
XHVUN received its concession on April 3, 1995.

References

Radio stations in Coahuila